Karjan is one of the 182 Legislative Assembly constituencies of Gujarat state in India. It is part of Vadodara district.

List of segments 

This assembly seat represents the following segments

 Karjan Taluka – Entire taluka except village – Umaj
 Sinor Taluka
Vadodara Taluka (Part) Villages – Karali, Itola, Vadsala, Untiya (Kajapur), Por, Raman Gamdi, Gosindra, Untiya (Medhad), Sarar, Kashipura, Ankhi, Fajalpur (Ankhi)

Members of Legislative Assembly
2007 - Chandubhai Dabhi, Indian National Congress
2012 - Satishbhai Patel,  Bharatiya Janata Party

Election results

2022

2020

2017

2012

See also
 List of constituencies of Gujarat Legislative Assembly
 Vadodara district

References

External links
 

Assembly constituencies of Gujarat
Vadodara district